Lahore Cantonment is a garrison located in Lahore, Punjab, Pakistan. Although the cantonment is located within Lahore City District (UC 152), it is an independent municipality under control of the Military Lands & Cantonments Department of the Ministry of Defence. Lahore Cantonment is regarded as an upscale neighbourhood of Lahore as it mostly consists of numerous housing schemes and high end markets

Neighbourhoods
Cantonment
Defence
Cavalry Ground
Islamnagar

Military
Lahore Cantonment serves as the headquarters of 4 Corps. The 10th and 11th Divisions of the Pakistan Army are also based in Lahore Cantonment.

Cemetery
The DHA Graveyard  in Lahore, Pakistan is a Muslim cemetery in Lahore Cantonment, Pakistan operated by the Defence Housing Authority. It is located in S-Block, Phase II (DHA) adjutant to Ghazi Road of Lahore Cantonment.

Transportation
Lahore Cantonment railway station
Allama Iqbal International Airport

Attractions
Fortress Stadium

See also
Lahore City District

References

External links
 Official Website of Lahore Cantonment Board

 
Lahore
Military in Lahore
Government of Lahore
Pakistan Navy bases